Pointer is a surname. Notable persons with the name include:

 Aaron Pointer (born 1942), American baseball player
 Anita Pointer (1948–2022), American singer-songwriter
 Ben Pointer (born 1996), English rugby league player
 Bonnie Pointer (1950–2020), American singer
 Chris Pointer (born 1976), American football defensive back
 Dick Pointer (before 1778 – 1827), American frontier hero 
 Ernest Pointer (1872– after 1900), English footballer
 Fred Pointer, Australian Paralympic athlete and wheelchair basketball player
 Grant Pointer (born 1987), English rugby union player
 Issa Pointer (born 1978), American singer
 John Pointer (cricketer) (1782–1815), English cricketer
 John Pointer (antiquary) (1668–1754), English cleric and antiquary
 John Pointer (American football) (born 1958), American football player
 Joseph Pointer (1875–1914), English patternmaker and politician
 June Pointer (1953–2006), American singer
 Mick Pointer (born 1956), English drummer
 Priscilla Pointer (born 1924), American actress
 Quinton Pointer (born 1988), American football cornerback 
 Ray Pointer (1936–2016), English footballer
 Ruth Pointer (born 1946), American singer–songwriter
 Sadako Pointer (born 1984), American singer
 Stanley Pointer, South Australian architect in practice with Herbert Jory (1888–1966)
 Sir'Dominic Pointer (born 1992), American basketball player
 Vena Pointer (1880–1971), American lawyer

See also 
 The Pointer Sisters
 Poynter